Full Moon, Dirty Hearts is the ninth studio album by Australian rock band INXS. It was released on 2 November 1993, through East West Records in Australia and in the United Kingdom by Phonogram's Mercury Records label. It was followed by the Dirty Honeymoon world tour of 1993–1994.

"Please" featured vocals by Ray Charles; the title track featured vocals by the Pretenders lead singer, Chrissie Hynde, however the latter was not released as a single, while the former was.

The band's manager, Chris Murphy, arranged to shoot videos for every song on the album. Twelve videos were shot on a small budget by different up and coming Australian directors.

The Japanese edition of the album included a cover of Steppenwolf's "Born to Be Wild", which was specially recorded for the April 1993 launch of Virgin Radio in the UK.

Background
As INXS were finishing their previous studio album Welcome to Wherever You Are, they decided not to tour in support for the album; instead the group promised to go straight into the studio to record a follow-up album, then later tour for both albums.

Following the release of Welcome to Wherever You Are, the band spent the next few months promoting the album across various countries in Europe, including the UK, France and Sweden.  While promoting the album in Europe, vocalist Michael Hutchence visited then girlfriend Helena Christensen in her home city of Copenhagen in Denmark. The couple were returning home on their bikes one night when Hutchence, who was standing in an alley with his bike, was punched from behind by a taxi driver and fell to the ground, hitting his head on the curb. He sustained a fractured skull and suffered the loss of his senses of smell and taste, and spent two weeks recovering in a Copenhagen hospital. In the unofficial biography Michael Hutchence: A Tragic Rock & Roll Story, Australian author Vince Lovegrove wrote, "It had a very strange effect on Michael. The alleged injury also caused the singer to act erratically, abusively and to suffer insomnia". These conditions had an impact on the production of Full Moon, Dirty Hearts.

Recording and production
The album was written soon after the release and promotion of the band's previous album, Welcome to Wherever You Are, at the end of November 1992. The album was recorded and produced at Capri Studio on the Isle of Capri in Italy and completed in February 1993. The Capri Studio had just reopened during the recording of Welcome to Wherever You Are and after spotting an ad for it in a trade magazine, Hutchence and producer Mark Opitz insisted that the band should record their next record there. Rehearsals for Full Moon, Dirty Hearts took place at Hutchence's villa in the south of France in October 1992 where the group were often distracted by other celebrities and supermodels who Hutchence regularly invited. The group decided to set off to the Isle of Capri early, arriving on the island one month after rehearsals. The journey was long and tiring for all members of the band as it took them almost two days of travelling to get there. Once on the island, each member of the band received their own villa, with the studio itself located close by; the studio sat atop a steep cliff, overlooking the Bay of Naples. Guitarist and saxophonist Kirk Pengilly recalls, "It was like a five-star Alcatraz". Hutchence and Optiz shared a villa on the island with Hutchence living upstairs and Opitz living downstairs.

Hutchence's condition raised concerns throughout the recording process. At first he became distraught about being isolated on the island. On the first night, Optiz was awakened at four a.m. to the sound of furniture being smashed upstairs by Hutchence. During one session, Hutchence threatened to stab bassist Gary Beers with a knife after the two had a dispute. Songwriter and multi-instrumentalist Andrew Farriss recalls another incident where Hutchence shoved his microphone straight through the strings of an acoustic guitar while shouting, "We need more aggression on this track!" In the band's 2005 official autobiography – INXS: Story to Story, Pengilly recalls, "Michael had very violent moments. He threw his microphone stand around inside the studio, and he threw violent tantrums all the time". The group took a one-month break for the Christmas period, allowing Hutchence time to recover from his condition and the rest of the band time to spend with their families. Before breaking for the Christmas holidays, the band got half of the album completed. Hutchence returned to his estate in France, later joining Farriss in London to write the last remaining songs for the album.

At the start of the New Year, Hutchence and Farriss returned to the Isle of Capri one week earlier along with Optiz and engineer Niven Garland. Upon returning to the sessions in Capri, Hutchence's behaviour had progressively returned to normal. While riding the hour and a half journey on the ferry from Naples to Capri, Hutchence began writing the lyrics for the album's title track. Chrissie Hynde from The Pretenders would perform the song along with Hutchence. As the remaining members of INXS were preparing to return to the island, Hutchence, Farriss, Optiz and Garland managed to get six more tracks for the album finished including, "Days of Rust", "Please (You Got That...)", "Freedom Deep", "Kill the Pain", "Viking Juice" and the title track. Production of the album came to an end in late February 1993 with everyone spending the final night capturing ideas and doing last minute touch ups on some of the tracks. The following morning, INXS caught the morning ferry back to Naples to prepare for their journey to Paris to carry out additional work on the album. Opitz took the recording tapes to Los Angeles where he mixed them with mixing engineer Bob Clearmountain.  Clearmountain previously engineered and mixed the band's best selling album, Kick.

While recording overdubs at a studio in Paris, Hutchence and Farriss discovered that Ray Charles was recording at the same studio. The pair asked his engineer if Charles would be interested in recording vocals on two tracks for the album,  "Make Your Peace" and "Please (You Got That...)". Charles passed on "Make Your Peace" because he thought the key was too high for his voice but he agreed to perform vocals on "Please (You Got That...)". The duet between Hutchence and Charles took place at Charles’ own recording studio in Los Angeles. Charles agreed to appear in the song's music video and would also perform the song live with INXS (a few days before the album's release) on the Late Show with David Letterman. The mixing of the album was completed by Opitz in July back on Capri while the band were touring some of the new songs on their Get Out of the House tour throughout the spring and summer.

Reception and release

Following the positive response to the sold-out UK Get Out of the House Tour in 1993, Full Moon, Dirty Hearts received mixed reviews on its release. In his AllMusic review, Stephen Thomas Erlewine rated the album one star and said, "Full Moon, Dirty Hearts sounds tired and as calculated as X." He concluded his review by stating, "INXS sounds energetic throughout the album, but the experimentation is poorly executed and there is a serious lack of strong songs and singles, apart from two duets: "Please (You Got That ...)" with Ray Charles and the title track, which features Chrissie Hynde."

Christian Wright rated the album three stars in his review for Rolling Stone. Although he criticised INXS for sounding like other artists on some of the album's songs, he did praise the album's third single, "Time". He wrote, "Thankfully, on "Time," with its guitar and vocal counterpoint, the band sounds like itself, and Hutchence resumes the instinctive swagger that made him a video star."

At the time, the band had been hyping up their new-found raw and "grungy" sound. The album's release marked a steep downturn in terms of sales, with the issue of only two singles worldwide: "The Gift" and "Please (You Got That ...)".

Commercial performance
Full Moon, Dirty Hearts entered the Billboard Top 200 in November 1993. It peaked at number 53 and lasted only five weeks in the charts. The album did perform better outside the States having charted at number 3 in the United Kingdom and number 4 in Australia, earning gold certifications in both countries.

Track listing

Personnel 
Personnel as listed in the album's liner notes are:

INXS
 Michael Hutchence – vocals
 Andrew Farriss – keyboards, guitars
 Tim Farriss – guitars
 Kirk Pengilly – guitars, saxophone, vocals
 Garry Gary Beers – bass, vocals
 Jon Farriss – drums, percussion, vocals

Additional musicians
 John Kirk – trumpet on "I'm Only Looking"
 Ray Charles – vocals on "Please (You Got That...)"
 Chrissie Hynde – vocals on "Full Moon, Dirty Hearts"

Production 
 Mark Opitz – producer, mixing (2, 4, 6, 7, 8, 10, 12)
 INXS – producers, front cover design
 Chris Kimsey – vocal producer (7)
 Bob Clearmountain – mixing (1, 3, 9, 10)
 Niven Garland – engineer, mixing (2, 4, 6, 7, 8, 10, 12)
 Brian Eno – mixing (5)
 Max Carola – assistant engineer 
 Ben Fenner – assistant engineer
 Alex Firla – assistant engineer
 Bruce Keen – assistant engineer 
 Pete Lewis – assistant engineer 
 John Mansey – assistant engineer 
 Melissa Van Twest – assistant engineer
 Randy Wine – assistant engineer
 Kevin Metcalfe – mastering engineer
 Michael Nash – design
 Enrique Badulescu – front cover photography
 Garry Beers – inside photography
 Leslie Farriss – inside photography
 Katerina Jebb – inside photography
 Chris Murphy – management
 MMA Management – management

Studios
 Additional recording and mixing at Studio Guillaume Tell (Suresnes, France); Olympic Studios and Westside Studios (London, UK); A&M Studios (Hollywood, California, USA).
 Mastered at The Town House (London, UK).

Charts and certifications

Weekly charts

Sales and certifications

References

INXS albums
1993 albums
Albums produced by Mark Opitz
Atlantic Records albums
East West Records albums
Mercury Records albums